The 1987 Atlanta Falcons season was the franchise's 22nd season in the National Football League (NFL). The Falcons finished with the worst record in the league, 3–12, and secured the first overall pick in the 1988 NFL Draft. Head coach Marion Campbell started his second stint as Falcons head coach in 1987 after previously coaching the team from 1974–1976.

Offseason

NFL Draft

Personnel

Staff

NFL replacement players
After the league decided to use replacement players during the NFLPA strike, the following team was assembled:

Roster

Regular season

Schedule

Standings

References

External links
 1987 Atlanta Falcons at Pro-Football-Reference.com

Atlanta
Atlanta Falcons seasons
Atlanta